Smallgoods is a term used in New Zealand and Australia to refer to small meat products such as ham, bacon, sausages or salami. 
 

Many companies, such as Primo Smallgoods in Sydney, Australia, specialise in the preparation and sale of smallgoods.

See also
Charcuterie
Delicatessen

References

Charcuterie
Lunch meat
Australian cuisine